First Methodist Church is a historic church at 410 E. University in Georgetown, Texas.

It was built in 1891 and added to the National Register in Texas.

See also

National Register of Historic Places listings in Williamson County, Texas
Recorded Texas Historic Landmarks in Williamson County

References

Methodist churches in Texas
Churches on the National Register of Historic Places in Texas
Gothic Revival church buildings in Texas
Churches completed in 1891
19th-century Methodist church buildings in the United States
Churches in Williamson County, Texas
National Register of Historic Places in Williamson County, Texas
Recorded Texas Historic Landmarks